"Loneliest Time of Year" is a Christmas song by English singer Mabel, released by Polydor Records on 22 November 2019. It was written by Mabel, MNEK, Tre Jean-Marie, Nayla Nyassa and Camille Purcell, and produced by Sillkey and Tre Jean-Marie.

Release
Mabel first teased "Loneliest Time of Year" on Twitter on 19 November 2019 by posting the lyrics, "Doesn't matter if I manage to get all the things on my list". She shared its accompanying cover art on social media and a short snippet of the song on TikTok the following day. The cover art is a polaroid of the singer wearing a plaid winter coat and Supreme winter hat in front of a snow backdrop. Upon the single's release on 22 November 2019, Mabel wrote, "Important to remember that what can be the best time of year for some can be the loneliest time of year for someone else so be kind and take care of each other this Christmas."
One year later, Mabel announced on 18 November 2020 via social media that she was going to re-release the song along with a cover of the song I'll Be Home for Christmas on 20 November 2020.

Critical reception
In his review for Idolator, Mike Wass called it a "wonderfully miserable" and "refreshingly realistic Christmas song".

Track listing
Digital download (2019)
"Loneliest Time of Year" – 3:22 

Digital download (2020)
"Loneliest Time of Year" – 3:22
"I'll Be Home for Christmas" – 3:15

Personnel
 Mabel – vocals
 Sillkey – production, drums, keyboards, piano, bass, synthesizer
 Tre Jean-Marie – production, drums, engineering, guitar, keyboards, strings, synthesizer, programming, background vocals
 MNEK – vocal production
 Matt Zara – guitar
 Phil Tan – mixing
 Stuart Hawkes – mastering
Credits adapted from Qobuz.

Charts

References

External links
 

2019 singles
2019 songs
British Christmas songs
Mabel (singer) songs
Polydor Records singles
Songs written by Kamille (musician)
Songs written by Mabel (singer)
Songs written by MNEK
Songs written by Tre Jean-Marie